Bridge in Jenner Township is a historic stone arch bridge in Jenner Township, Somerset County, Pennsylvania.  It was built in 1908, and is a  bridge, constructed of rocked faced ashlar. The bridge crosses Roaring Run.

It was added to the National Register of Historic Places in 1980.

References

Road bridges on the National Register of Historic Places in Pennsylvania
Bridges completed in 1908
Bridges in Somerset County, Pennsylvania
National Register of Historic Places in Somerset County, Pennsylvania
1908 establishments in Pennsylvania
Stone arch bridges in the United States